Sfira, or Mrah Es-Sfire     is a northern Lebanese Sunni Muslim located in Miniyeh-Danniyeh District. In the 2009 elections, it had 4,449 eligible voters. It is  bounded on the north by Kfarbnine, on the south by Beit El faqs, on the west by the mountain of Sfira and on the east by the western Lebanese chain.

References

External links
Sfireh, Localiban

Populated places in Miniyeh-Danniyeh District
Populated places in Lebanon
Sunni Muslim communities in Lebanon